Jennings Creek is a stream in the U.S. state of Ohio.

Jennings Creek was named for Colonel Jennings, a pioneer settler (the village of Fort Jennings, Ohio in Putnam County also bears his name).

See also
List of rivers of Ohio

References

Rivers of Allen County, Ohio
Rivers of Putnam County, Ohio
Rivers of Van Wert County, Ohio
Rivers of Ohio